Georgette Florence Koyt-Deballé (born 1960) is an academic administrator from the Central African Republic.

Life
After studying in France, in 1988 Koyt-Deballé became a professor of English at the University of Bangui in 1988. From 2011 to 2013, she was rector of the University of Bangui.

Works
 C'est la vie: poèmes, Bangui, 2007.
 Nago, ou, Comment s'en sortir, Bangui, 2008.

References

1960 births
Living people
Central African Republic women writers
Central African Republic writers
Women academic administrators
Central African Republic academics
Academic staff of the University of Bangui